Vaghuhas or Gozlu is a village de facto in the Martakert Province of the breakaway Republic of Artsakh, de jure in the Kalbajar District of Azerbaijan, in the disputed region of Nagorno-Karabakh. The village has an ethnic Armenian-majority population, and also had an Armenian majority in 1989.

History 

During the Soviet period, the village was a part of the Mardakert District of the Nagorno-Karabakh Autonomous Oblast.

Historical heritage sites 
Historical heritage sites in and around the village include the ruins of the ancient Armenian settlement of Mayrakahag, including the Tiramayr Monastery built in 1183, an 8th/9th-century chapel, a 12th/13th-century cemetery, the monastery of Khatravank built in 1204, the monastery of Karmiravan built in 1224, also known as the Red Monastery – Karmir Vank, and the medieval village of Hin Vaghuhas.

Economy and culture 
The population is mainly engaged in agriculture and animal husbandry. As of 2015, the village has a municipal building, a house of culture, a secondary school, seven shops, and a medical centre.

Demographics 
The village had 638 inhabitants in 2005, and 678 inhabitants in 2015.

Gallery

References

External links 

 

Populated places in Martakert Province
Populated places in Kalbajar District